Świat (Polish for "World") is a Polish coat of arms. It was used by several szlachta (noble) families under the Polish–Lithuanian Commonwealth.

History

Blazon

Notable bearers
Notable bearers of this coat of arms have included:

See also
 Polish heraldry
 Heraldry
 Coat of arms

Polish coats of arms